Albina Românească ("The Romanian Bee") was a Romanian-language bi-weekly political and literary magazine, printed in Iaşi, Moldavia, at two intervals during the Regulamentul Organic period (between June 1, 1829, and January 3, 1835, and again between January 3, 1837, and January 2, 1850). The owner and editor was Gheorghe Asachi. It published the literary supplement Alăuta Românească.

Albina Românească was the second journal to be published in its country, after the French-language Courrier de Moldavie, and the first Romanian-language one in Moldavia. Alongside Curierul Românesc, edited by Ion Heliade Rădulescu in Wallachia, and George Bariţiu's Gazeta de Transilvania, it was one of the main Romanian periodical press of the time.

See also
 List of magazines in Romania

References

1829 establishments in Europe
1829 establishments in the Ottoman Empire
1850 disestablishments in Europe
1850 disestablishments in the Ottoman Empire
19th-century disestablishments in Moldavia
Biweekly magazines
Defunct literary magazines published in Europe
Defunct magazines published in Romania
Defunct political magazines
Literary magazines published in Romania
Magazines established in 1829
Magazines disestablished in 1850
Mass media in Iași
Political magazines published in Romania
Romanian-language magazines